The Florida Gators softball team represents the University of Florida in the sport of softball. Florida competes in Division I of the National Collegiate Athletics Association (NCAA) and the Southeastern Conference (SEC). The Gators play their home games at Katie Seashole Pressly Softball Stadium on the university's Gainesville, Florida campus, and are currently led by head coach Tim Walton. In the twenty-six year history of the Florida Softball program, the team has won two Women's College World Series (WCWS) national championships, nine SEC regular season championships, five SEC tournament championships, and have made eleven WCWS appearances.

History

Ray era: 1997–2000 

On June 13, 1995, the board of directors of the University Athletic Association approved the addition of a women's softball team to the University of Florida's athletic program. Larry Ray, who would coach the new team for their first four seasons, agreed to be the first head coach on September 4, 1995. After the construction of their new stadium facility, the Gators played their first two games in a doubleheader on February 8, 1997, against the Stetson Hatters, both of which they won.

In the inaugural year of the Florida Softball program, Ray's team posted an overall win–loss record of 42–25 and a Southeastern Conference record of 16–8, and was the runner-up in the SEC softball tournament, ultimately losing to the second-ranked South Carolina Gamecocks in the title game. Florida built on the early success of their first season to win the program's first-ever SEC regular season championship in 1998, and advance to the NCAA Tournament. After the 2000 season, Ray left Florida to return to an assistant coaching position with the Arizona Wildcats softball team at the University of Arizona, where he previously coached.

Johns era: 2001–2005 

For the 2001 season, Ray was replaced by Karen Johns. Under Johns, Florida qualified for the NCAA Tournament four of five seasons, and compiled a record of 192–131 during her tenure in Gainesville. After the Gators finished third in the SEC Eastern Division for the fourth straight season, and suffered four consecutive losses in the 2005 SEC Tournament and the opening round of the NCAA tournament, Johns was fired.

Walton era: 2006–present 

To replace Johns, Florida athletic director Jeremy Foley hired the then-head coach of the Wichita State Shockers softball team, Tim Walton, as the Gators' new coach. Under Walton, the Florida softball team has become a consistent SEC and national title contender. In 2014, the Gators won their first national title over Alabama, and the following year they repeated as national champions, this time by defeating Michigan.

2008 World Series 

In his third season as the Gators' head coach, he led the team to an NCAA single season record seventy wins and five losses. The team also made its first-ever Women's College World Series (WCWS) appearance after beating the California Golden Bears, two games to none, in the Gainesville Super Regional of the NCAA tournament. After losing its opening game of the WCWS to Louisiana Lafayette, the Gators won three straight against games the Virginia Tech Hokies and Texas A&M Aggies. However, in the double-elimination format of the NCAA Tournament, the Gators needed to beat Texas A&M twice in the WCWS semifinals to move into the championship final series. That second semifinal game went two extra innings before either team scored, and the Aggies earned the 1–0 victory in the ninth inning. Gators pitcher Stacey Nelson ended the 2008 season with single-season school records in wins (47), strikeouts (363), innings pitched (352.1), and earned run average (0.75).

2009 World Series 

Florida began its 2009 season ranked No. 1 in the country in both major college softball polls, but finished second after falling 8–0 and 3–2 to the Washington Huskies in the best-of-three-games final championship series of the 2009 Women's College World Series. The Gators compiled an overall record of 63–5 and completed its SEC regular season with a record of 26–1. They also broke the SEC single-season record for home runs (86), and several single-season team records including grand slams (12), total shutouts (39), and consecutive shutouts (11). Aja Paculba set the single-season stolen base record (27), Francesca Enea broke the career home run record (41) in her junior season, and the Florida pitching staff threw three no-hitters in the regular season (Stephanie Brombacher vs. Coastal Carolina; Stacey Nelson vs. Ole Miss and Arkansas). Nelson was named the Lowe's Senior CLASS Award winner and the SEC Pitcher of the year for the second straight year. Nelson was named to the All-American first team (pitcher), and Brombacher (pitcher), Enea (outfielder), Kelsey Bruder (outfielder), and Paculba (second baseman) were named to the second team.

2010 World Series 

The 2010 Florida softball team again qualified for the NCAA tournament and advanced to the 2010 Women's College World Series. In the opening game of the Series, the fourth-seeded Gators were decisively defeated 16–3 by the UCLA Bruins, who ultimately won the 2010 championship. The Gators recovered to eliminate the ninth-seeded Missouri Tigers 5–2, before being edged 3–2 and eliminated in turn by the sixth-seeded Georgia Bulldogs.

2011 World Series 

During the 2011 season, Florida experienced a series of up-and-down streaks, but recovered to win the SEC Eastern Division for the fourth consecutive year. After being upset by the Auburn Tigers in the first round of the SEC tournament, the Gators qualified for the NCAA tournament and advanced to the 2011 Women's College World Series. In the World Series semi-finals, Florida twice defeated the SEC champion Alabama Crimson Tide, 16–2 and 9–2, to advance to the finals. The top-ranked Arizona State Sun Devils, in turn, swept the Gators, 14–4 and 7–2, in the best-of-three championship finals.

2012 NCAA Tournament 
On the eve of the NCAA Tournament, three players: Cheyenne Coyle, Sami Fagan, and Kasey Fagan were dismissed from the team. No. 5 Florida lost to Florida Gulf Coast and USF in the Regionals and failed to reach the WCWS for the first time in Walton's tenure at UF.

2013 World Series 
Despite winning the SEC regular season and tournament titles, No. 2 Florida lost to Tennessee 2–9 to open the WCWS. After a thrilling 9–8 extra innings game win against Nebraska, they lost 0–3 to Texas to end their season.

2014 National Champs 
Florida beat rival Alabama for their first national championship with tournament MVP Hannah Rogers in the circle.

2015 National Champs

Led by the USA Softball Collegiate Player of the Year in Lauren Haeger, Florida became just the third team in the history of college softball to win back to back national championships. They defeated Michigan in the last game of the best of three series 4–1 to win the title. Lauren Haeger then went on to win the 2015 Honda Award.

2017 World Series

In 2017, Florida again secured the number one seed for the third straight year. After failing to make it to the WCWS in 2016 as the number one seed, Florida made it to the finals. In the finals, Florida took on rival Oklahoma, the number 10 overall seed. Oklahoma outlasted Florida after 17 innings in what was the longest WCWS softball game ever played. The following day, after presumably being exhausted, Florida lost 4-5, allowing Oklahoma to go on and win the 2017 WCWS.

Coaching staff

Facility upgrades 
In September 2016, the UAA announced a massive $100 million facilities initiative that included renovating many areas of the University of Florida's sports landscape. One of the improvements included in the plan was a renovation of the softball complex at Seashole Pressly Stadium. The plan states that existing bleachers behind home plate would be replaced with chairback seating, with additional bleachers extended down each foul line to accommodate 750 to 1,000 more seats; expanded press box, concession and restroom areas, upgraded coaches and players' facilities, as well as some shade structure. The university hopes to complete these projects before 2021.

Year-by-year results

NCAA Tournament seeding history
National seeding began in 2005. The Florida Gators are one of only three teams to have a national seed every year since, along with Alabama and Tennessee.

Player awards

National awards
Senior Class Award
Stacey Nelson (2009)
USA Softball Collegiate Player of the Year
Lauren Haeger (2015)
Kelly Barnhill (2017)
Honda Sport Award

 Kelly Barnhill (2017)
Lauren Haeger (2015)
NFCA National Freshman of the Year
Amanda Lorenz (2016)

Conference awards
SEC Player of the Year
Chelsea Sakizzie (1998)
Kristen Butler (2006)
Kelsey Bruder (2011)
Megan Moultrie (2012)
Kelsey Stewart (2015)
Amanda Lorenz (2018)

SEC Pitcher of the Year
Stacy Nelson (2008, 2009)
Lauren Haeger (2015)
Kelly Barnhill (2017, 2018)

SEC Freshman of the Year
Mandy Schuerman (2002)
Amanda Lorenz (2016)

All-Americans 

The Florida Gators softball program has produced 38 Louisville Slugger/NFCA All-American selections.

Chelsey Sakizzie – 1998 3rd team
Stacey Nelson – 2007 2nd team
Kim Waleszonia – 2007 3rd team
Francesca Enea – 2008 2nd team
Ali Gardiner – 2008 1st team
Stacey Nelson – 2008 1st team
Aja Paculba – 2008 2nd team
Kim Waleszonia – 2008 3rd team
Stephanie Brombacher – 2009 2nd team
Kelsey Bruder – 2009 2nd team
Francesca Enea – 2009 2nd team
Stacey Nelson – 2009 1st team
Aja Paculba – 2009 2nd team
Francesca Enea – 2010 2nd team
Stephanie Brombacher – 2010 3rd team
Megan Bush – 2011 1st team
Kelsey Bruder – 2011 1st team
Brittany Schutte – 2011 1st team
Hannah Rogers – 2011 2nd team
Aja Paculba – 2011 3rd team
Michelle Moultrie – 2011 3rd team
Michelle Moultrie – 2012 1st team
Hannah Rogers – 2012 2nd team
Hannah Rogers – 2013 1st team
Lauren Haeger – 2013 1st team
Kelsey Stewart – 2014 1st team
Hannah Rogers – 2014 3rd team
Lauren Haeger – 2015 1st team
Kelsey Stewart – 2015 1st team
Aleshia Ocasio – 2015 3rd team
 Delanie Gourley – 2016 1st team
 Aleshia Ocasio – 2016 1st team
 Kayli Kvistad – 2016 2nd team
 Amanda Lorenz – 2016 3rd team
Kelly Barnhill – 2017 1st team
 Delanie Gourley – 2017 1st team
 Amanda Lorenz – 2017 1st team
 Kayli Kvistad – 2017 3rd team

2020 U.S. Olympic Team
 Michelle Moultrie
 Aubree Munro
 Kelsey Stewart

Records

See also 

 Florida Gators
 Florida Gators baseball
 History of the University of Florida
 List of University of Florida Athletic Hall of Fame members
 University Athletic Association
List of NCAA Division I softball programs

References

External links 

|}

 
1997 establishments in Florida